The schooner or gunboat HMS Speedy sank in a snowstorm in Lake Ontario south of the future site of Brighton, Ontario, and west of Prince Edward County, on 8 October 1804, with the loss of all hands. The sinking changed the course of Canadian history because of the prominence of the citizens of the tiny colony of Upper Canada lost in the disastrous event.

The ship was built for the Provincial Marine in 1798 at the Point Frederick Navy Depot and was used to transport government officials and supplies.

Description
HMS Speedy was one of five warships rushed into service, quickly built from green timber at Cataraqui (present-day Kingston) in 1798, to help defend British Upper Canada from the perceived threat from the newly formed United States. That threat was later realised as the War of 1812, but Speedy would not survive to see service in that conflict. In spite of her name, Speedy was considered slow for her era. Because she was constructed from improperly seasoned green timber, she almost immediately began to suffer problems with leaks and dry rot after her commissioning.

Final voyage of the Speedy
The schooner was set to sail from the Queen's Quay, York, present-day Toronto, the young capital of Upper Canada, to the district town of Newcastle District (not the present-day town of Newcastle) on Presqu'ile Point (now Presqu'ile Provincial Park) for a prominent murder trial ostensibly to 'legitimize' a newly built district courthouse.

Speedy was carrying the first provincial law-enforcement officer to lose his life in the execution of office.  High Constable Fisk was transporting a prisoner to court in Newcastle. The prisoner was Ogetonicut, a member of the Ojibway tribe, who was accused of murdering trading post operator John Sharpe near Lake Scugog. Ogetonicut was suspected of exacting revenge for the killing of his brother, Whistling Duck. Although Ogetonicut was arrested near York, the crime had allegedly been committed in Newcastle District, and under British law of the time, one had to be tried in the jurisdiction in which the crime was purported to have been committed. Also on board were Justice Thomas Cochrane, the judge for Ogetonicut's trial, and the accused's lawyer.

The ship was also carrying six handwritten copies of the new Constitution of Upper Canada, supplies, and a Royal surveyor, John Stegman, a former Hessian soldier, to help in the planning, construction, and expansion of the fledgling district town, which consisted of nothing more than the three-story courthouse/jail, a handful of residences and a survey plan. Sir Robert Isaac Dey Grey (of Bruce-Grey County fame), first Solicitor-General of Upper Canada was also on board. 
 
The schooner left York on 7 October 1804 at the insistence of autocratic Lieutenant-Governor Peter Hunter, despite the reluctance of the ship's captain, Lieutenant Thomas Paxton. Paxton, an experienced British naval officer, was concerned about an incoming storm and the condition of the ship.

Although only six years old, Speedy suffered from extensive weakening of the hull from dry rot due to the timber used in her rushed construction. Two of Speedys crew were required to constantly operate manual bilge pumps  to keep her afloat for the journey. Under threat of court-martial, Paxton departed. Almost immediately upon her launch, she ran aground in the harbour due to the heavy load, resulting in a six-hour delay.

After freeing herself, she sailed due east. Speedy stopped briefly at Port Oshawa to pick up the Farewell brothers who were business partners of the murder victim and key witnesses for the prosecution, and a handful of Natives who were also to provide testimony.  The Farewell brothers refused to board the ship, expressing concern that it was already overloaded, crowded, and unsafe. They elected to accompany Speedy in a canoe.

Speedy and the canoe were separated as the storm deteriorated into blizzard conditions during the afternoon and evening of 8 October. The wind had turned and was blowing out of the northeast.  By the morning of 9 October, the brothers managed to reach Newcastle's harbour. Not so for Speedy.  The schooner was sighted passing Presqu'ile Point at dusk on 8 October.  The crew fired one of her cannons to signal her situation and position. In response; shoreline bonfires were lit, ostensibly to guide her to safety.

The schooner vanished on approach to the mouth of the bay (Presqu'ile Bay). All that was found of the ship, her passengers, cargo, and six-man crew were a chicken coop and compass box.  These washed up on the beach opposite the bay.

Investigation
Unable to navigate using celestial markers or spot the signal fires due to the storm-induced white outs, the captain was completely reliant on the ship's compass to navigate.  Evidence suggests that Speedy was unaware of being in the area now known as the Sophiasburgh Triangle, where magnetic anomalies purportedly exist and prevent proper compass operation. And, being unable to sail directly into the northeasterly wind because she was a square-rigger, she had trouble steering. It is possible that the Speedy struck the mysterious Devil's Horseblock (or Hitching Post), a stone pinnacle that extended up to within  20 cm of the surface.

The area was dragged with hooks in a government-sponsored effort to establish what had actually transpired.  It was established that the mysterious monolithic Horseblock shoal had also vanished.  Some  suggested the 200-ton Speedy was capable of up-ending or toppling over this unusual formation.

Speedy became the latest of nearly 100 ships The Sophiasburgh Triangle had claimed since the beginning of the 18th century, adding to fears that the area was too dangerous for a major port.

Legacy
In part due to this disaster, Presqu'ile was deemed an inappropriate and "inconvenient" location for a district town. The incident was called "a disaster felt by the Bench, the Bar Society, the Legislature and the Country." The new settlement at Newcastle was abandoned and the district centre was moved to Amherst (now known as Cobourg) in 1805. A new town bearing the name of Newcastle was established some 50 years later, in a different location.

Each summer the story of Speedy is told through a history play as part of Presqu'ile Provincial Park's Natural Heritage Education program. The story is also told by an interactive video display at the point in the Lighthouse Interpretive Centre. The point is also home to a commemorative plaque, erected by the Ontario Historical Society. A play about the sinking was put on at Harbourfront Centre in Toronto in 2017.

Search for wreck
Ed Burtt, a wreck hunter searched for the wreck and claimed to have found it in 1990, and hoped to salvage it under maritime laws. Burtt recovered some items from the wreck, potentially identifying it. He kept the location secret, planning to house relics in an exhibit space. Burtt passed away in 2017 without revealing the location of the wreck. Other divers plan to continue the search.

Casualties
Records are not clear, listing somewhere between 20 and 39 passengers aboard Speedy, along with her crew of 6. It may never be known exactly how many were killed in the sinking. Those lost included:

Lieutenant Thomas Paxton, Captain of HMS Speedy
John Cameron, Speedy crew member
Francis Labard, Speedy crew member
Ogetonicut, accused murderer
Angus Macdonell, defence lawyer and member of the Upper Canada House of Assembly
George Cowan, Coldwater-based fur trader and interpreter employed by the government's Indian Department
Justice Thomas Cochran, the trial judge, Judge of the Court of King's Bench of Upper Canada
Robert Isaac Dey Grey, prosecutor and the first Solicitor-General of Upper Canada
Simon Baker, slave of Dey Grey
John Anderson, law student
John Stegman, land surveyor of the Surveyor-General's Office, possible trial witness
James Ruggles, Justice of the Peace, possible trial witness
Two or three unnamed First Nations men and women, trial witnesses
John Fisk, High Constable of York, first police officer killed in the line of duty in the Ontario and Canada
Jacob Herchmer, prominent Loyalist merchant and fur trader, Lieutenant in York Militia
Two young children, sent on the "safer" Speedy by overland-travelling parents who could not afford passage for themselves

References

Bibliography

External links
Friends of Presqu'ile, story of HMS Speedy
JW Fisher's Underwater Search Equipment article, with history of Speedy and her possible discovery by Ed Burtt
 List of Vessels Employed on British Naval Service on the Great Lakes, 1755-1875
 The Officer Down Memorial Page - John Fisk

Schooners of the Royal Navy
Shipwrecks of Lake Ontario
Great Lakes ships
Maritime incidents in 1804
1798 ships
Provincial Marine
Ships built in Ontario